The Diocese of Kimberley and Kuruman is a diocese in the Anglican Church of Southern Africa, and encompasses the area around Kimberley and Kuruman and overlaps the Northern Cape Province and North West Province of South Africa. It is presided over by the Bishop of Kimberley and Kuruman, until recently Ossie Swartz. On 19 September 2021 the Electoral College of Bishops elected to translate the Right Revd Brian Marajh of George to become the 13th Bishop of Kimberley & Kuruman. The seat of the Bishop of Kimberley and Kuruman is at St Cyprian's Cathedral, Kimberley. There had been so far 12 bishops of the See, though one of these served for two different periods of time.

Formation of the diocese

The Anglican presence on the Diamond Fields and in Kimberley's hinterland, from the early 1870s, was at first administered from Bloemfontein, initially under Allan Webb, the oldest parish here being St Mary's, Barkly West. By the early 1890s, however, there was a feeling in some quarters that the Diocese of Bloemfontein was too big and there were proposals for the formation of a separate bishopric with its seat in Kimberley. But in the event the bishops decided upon establishing the missionary Diocese of Mashonaland instead – an area also up until then administered from Bloemfontein.

From 1907 to 1910 motions were passed and planning and fund-raising initiatives were being conducted in earnest towards founding a new Diocese of Kimberley. These included the "Million Shillings Fund" launched by Arthur Chandler, Bishop of Bloemfontein, in London on 2 February 1909. It was hoped that all would be in place so that the coming into being of the new Diocese would coincide with the establishment of Union in South Africa in 1910. However it was not before July 1911 that all was ready and a formal resolution could be proposed, as it was at a meeting in the Kimberley Town Hall, that ‘the western portion of the Diocese of Bloemfontein be constituted a new and separate Diocese with Kimberley as its Cathedral Town’ – to which the Episcopal Synod, meeting in Maritzburg, gave its final consent in the form of a mandate dated 11 October 1911. The elective assembly for the choosing of a bishop for the new diocese was held in Kimberley on 13 December 1911, at which Wilfrid Gore Browne, Dean of Pretoria, was the unanimous choice. Gore Browne was consecrated in the Bloemfontein Cathedral on 29 June 1912. He was enthroned the following day as bishop of Kimberley and Kuruman, at St Cyprian's Cathedral.

Geographical extent

The Diocese of Kimberley and Kuruman has not been constant in extent and at times less than exactly defined. Taking over the western side of the Diocese of Boemfontein (now "of the Free State"), it also included some of the sparsely populated interior extremities of the Dioceses of Cape Town and of Grahamstown. The southern half of Bechuanaland Protectorate was added om 1915 and remained part of "K&K" (as Kimberley and Kuruman is often called) until Botswana's independence in 1966. This history flavoured liturgical usage there, which still resembles the style more of the South African Prayer Book than the Central African Prayer Book. The 1952 diocesan synod was concerned to establish the boundaries of parishes; noting also a lack of clarity on "where is the Diocese" – "The Bishop called attention ... to the fact that certain places where at present the Diocese has Clergymen at work are not technically in the Diocese."

Bishops

Notable clergy and people
Besides the bishops of the see (above) and the Deans of Kimberley (see also the early Rectors of St Cyprian's), notable clergy and people of the diocese have included: The so-called "Big Three" pioneer missionary priests of the diocese, W.H.R. Bevan of Phokwane; George Mervyn Lawson, archdeacon of Griqualand West; and Frederick William Peasley of Bothithong; Henrietta Stockdale, a sister of the Community of St Michael and All Angels; Levi Kraai, ordained by Gore-Browne in 1913; J. W. Mogg, who served the diocese from 1915 to 1945; Walter Wade, of St Matthew's Barkly Road, Archdeacon of Bechuanaland and of Kimberley, and afterwards Dean of Umtata and Suffragan Bishop of Cape Town; Joseph Thekiso, an archdeacon; Theo Naledi, afterwards Bishop of Botswana; Richard Stanley Cutts, an archdeacon, afterwards Dean of Salisbury and later the bishop of Buenos Aires; Alan Butler, latterly director of the Kuruman Moffat Mission; George Pressly; John William Salt, afterwards dean of Eshowe and bishop of St Helena; Kimberley-born Brian Marajh, bishop of George; Kimberley-born Margaret Vertue, bishop of False Bay and second woman to be elected as a bishop of the Anglican Church of Southern Africa and of the whole African continent.

Current archdeaconries and parishes

Some of the parishes in the diocese date back to the beginnings of Anglican work on the Diamond Fields and in Kimberley's hinterland, for example St Mary's, Barkly West and the Cathedral Parish of St Cyprian. They have multiplied in number, various parishes being subdivided or consolidated through time. It follows that boundaries have not been unchanging. The archdeaconry structure has been even more dynamic, responding to the needs of the day at different periods. In 2010 an experimental division between north and south was replaced when the archdeaconries of the Molopo, the Kgalagadi and the Karoo, additional to the Cathedral archdeaconry, were created. Currently these administrative units are the archdeaconries of the Cathedral, The Diamond Fields, Gariep, Kgalagadi, and Molopo, embracing the following parishes (Schedule of Archdeaconries as of May 2017):

Cathedral
 The Cathedral Church of St Cyprian the Martyr, Kimberley.
 St Alban's, De Beers

Archdeaconry of the Diamond Fields
 All Saints, Homevale
 St Matthew's, Barkly Road
 St Barnabas, Florianville
 St Mary Magdalene, Ritchie
 St Augustine's, West End
 St Paul's, Vergenoeg
 St Peter's, Greenpoint
 St Mary the Virgin, Barkly West – the oldest Parish Church in the Diocese
 St Francis, Roodepan
 St James, Galeshewe

Archdeaconry of Gariep
 All Saints, Paballelo
 St Andrew's, Prieska
 St Philip's, Boegoeberg
 St Matthew's, Oranjekruin, Upington
 Annunciation, Douglas
 St Luke's, Prieska
 Good Shepherd, Nonzwakazi, De Aar
 St Martin's, Breipaal, Douglas
 St Thomas, De Aar

[with St Anne's, Niekerkshoop; St Paul's, Marydale; St Barnabas, Britstown; St Andrew's, Philipstown; St Matthew's, Richmond]

Archdeaconry of the Kgalagadi

 St Mary-le-Bourne, Kuruman
 St Monica, Tsineng
 St Paul's, Mothibistad
 St Timothy, Seoding
 St Wilfred, Maruping
 St Peter's Wrenchville
 St Laurence, Danielskuil
 St John's, Bothithong
 St Michael and All Angels, Batlharos
 St Francis, Manyeding
 Good Shepherd

Several of these parishes have numerous outstations

Archdeaconry of the Molopo
 Resurrection, Mmabatho 
 All Saints, Montshiwa
 St John the Evangelist, Mafikeng
 Transfiguration, Setlagole
 St Michael and All Angels, Lomanyaneng
 Holy Cross, Pudimong
 St Chad's, Taung
 St Mary's, Matalong
 All Saints, Pampierstad
 St Peter's, Ganyesa
 St Hubert's, Hartsvaal Parish
 St Augustine's Hartsvaal
 St George, Warrenton
 St Peter's, Ikhutseng
 St Stephen's, Vryburg
 St Philip's, Huhudi
 St John, Tlakgameng

Several of these parishes have numerous outstations

Coat of arms 
The diocese assumed arms at the time of its inception, and had them granted by the College of Arms in 1953 : Per pale Argent and Sable, a cross potent counterchanged within a bordure Azure charged with eleven lozenges of the first.

Relationship with Oxford
The diocese has a link partnership with the Diocese of Oxford, established in 1993. Visits by John Pritchard, Bishop of Oxford, to Kimberley and Kuruman in 2008 and 2010, by Bishop Oswald Swartz to Lambeth Palace (and Oxford) in 2008, and by other senior clergy and people from both sides of the link, strengthened partnerships with focus areas on HIV/Aids and other key projects. The Dean of Kimberley, the Very Revd Reginald Leeuw, represented his diocese at the inauguration of the Rt Revd Dr Steven Croft as Bishop of Oxford in 2016. A large contingent flew with Bishop Croft to Kimberley for a Link Summit in 2017, and a meeting on environmental issues followed in Oxford a year later. A planned Link Summit to have taken place in Oxford in 2020 was called off owing to the COVID-19 pandemic.

References

1911 establishments in South Africa
Anglican Church of Southern Africa dioceses
Christian organizations established in 1911